The Italian Unionist Movement (Movimento Unionista Italiano) was a shortlived Italian political party that advocated for Italy to become part of the United States.

The party was founded on 12 October (Columbus Day) 1944 by sociologist , Calabrian activist Santi Paladino and ISTAT researcher Corrado Gini. The party emblem featured a globe with the American flag and Italian flag and the words "Peace and work" and "United States of the World". According to the three men, the Government of the United States should annex all free and democratic nations worldwide, thereby transforming itself into a world government, and allowing Washington, D.C. to maintain Earth in a perpetual condition of peace. Paladino stated, "With a federation of the United States, Italy and some other nations, and a lot of atomic bombs, there would be no wars. This would solve all of Italy's problems." Paladino argued that a closer union with the United States was necessary to counter the advance of communism under Soviet leadership.

After some success in local elections in Southern Italy in 1946, the party ran in the 1946 Italian general election, the first general elections held in Italy after the fall of fascism. The party's results were very poor, receiving only 0.3% of votes, with only Ugo Damiani being elected in the Constituent Assembly. As MP, Damiani supported federalistic ideas, but the main goal of the party was evidently impossible to reach. As the American government did not support the party or its project, the movement was disbanded in 1948.

Italian Parliament

References

External links
Ugo Damiani's Deputy Profile (in Italian)
North Milan News Article (in Italian)

1944 establishments in Italy
1948 disestablishments in Italy
Conservative parties in Italy
Defunct conservative parties
Defunct liberal political parties
Defunct political parties in Italy
Federalist parties in Italy
Italy–United States relations
Liberal conservative parties
Liberal parties in Italy
Political parties disestablished in 1948
Political parties established in 1944
Proposed states and territories of the United States